Raa Raa is a 2018 Indian Telugu-language comedy horror film directed by Shankar and starring Srikanth, Naziya, and Seetha Narayana. This is Srikanth's first horror film.

Cast 

Srikanth as Raj Kiran
Naziya as Madi Vadani
Seetha Narayana
Giri Babu as a film director
Shakalaka Shankar as Bumper Star
Venu Tillu
Getup Srinu
Ali
Chammak Chandra
Raghu Babu
Jeeva
Hema
Posani Krishna Murali
Raghu Karumanchi
Prudhvi Raj

Soundtrack 
Music composed by Rap Rock Shakeel.
"Gallate Gallate" - Moushmi Neha
"Nila Nila" - Vedala Hemachandra, Rap Rock Shakeel 
"Android Phone" - Rap Rock Shakeel, Sravana Bhargavi
"Turrumani" - Rap Rock Shakeel, Swaraag Keerthan, Allrounder Ravi
"Raa Raa" - Moushmi Neha

Release 
The Times of India gave the film a rating of one-and-a-half out of five stars and noted that " Suffice to say that Raa Raa is one film to which you can safely say Raanu". Deccan Chronicle gave the film the same rating and wrote "A big disappointment for Srikanth and you can give a complete miss to this film". Cinema Express gave the film the same rating and note that "Raa Raa runs you over and makes you feel restless without doing anything exciting. Overall, it’s an incredibly awry story that fails to engage its viewers on any level". Telangana Today wrote that "The movie has an interesting storyline but fails to fire properly". The Hans India wrote that "The point of the movie is routine, and we have already seen it in several other movies in the past".

References

External links 

2018 films
2010s Telugu-language films
Indian comedy horror films
Indian ghost films
2018 comedy horror films